Campaign Castle is a town located in the province of Saint George, Barbados. Campaign Castle is located 11km east of Bridgetown. It is surrounded by Boarded Hall, Watts Village, Dash Valley and Monroe Village.

References 

Populated places in Barbados